Neureclipsis is a genus of tube maker caddisflies in the family Polycentropodidae. There are at least 8 described species in Neureclipsis.

Taxonomic note:
Type species: Phryganea bimaculata C Linnaeus (monobasic).

Species
 Neureclipsis bimaculata (Linnaeus, 1758)
 Neureclipsis crepuscularis (Walker, 1852)
 Neureclipsis kyotoensis Iwata, 1927
 Neureclipsis melco Ross, 1947
 Neureclipsis napaea Neboiss, 1986
 Neureclipsis parvula Banks, 1907
 Neureclipsis piersoni Frazer & Harris, 1991
 Neureclipsis valida (Walker, 1852)

References

Further reading

External links

 NCBI Taxonomy Browser, Neureclipsis

External link

Trichoptera genera